Baqer Moin is a BBC journalist and author. He has been described as "a specialist on Iran and Islam and is head of the BBC's Persian Service" (in 1999) and as "BBC's Central Asia specialist" (2001)

According to the American newspaper The New York Times, Moin grew up in Iran, where he learned "Persian and Arabic poetry, mysticism and philosophy from his father, who was trained as a cleric but earned a living as a farmer." Moin studied in the religious seminaries of Mashhad in Eastern Iran before becoming a journalist. As of August 27, 2000 he was head of the BBC's Persian service, a broadcast service so influential in Iran that "even Ayatollah Khomeini listened to it". 
He is the author of the book Khomeini: Life of the Ayatolla.  which the NY Times called "the first serious and accessible examination of the ayatollah's life."  Amazon.com describes him as having written extensively on Islam, Iran and Afghanistan."

See also
Ruhollah Khomeini
BBC

Notes

Iranian journalists
Iranian emigrants to the United Kingdom
Year of birth missing (living people)
Living people